Brandy Creek is a rural locality in the Whitsunday Region, Queensland, Australia.

Road infrastructure
The Shute Harbour Road (State Route 59) runs along the western boundary.

References 

Whitsunday Region
Localities in Queensland